The Boadicea-class cruiser was a pair of scout cruisers built for the Royal Navy in the first decade of the 20th century. They were the first class of this type to be fitted with steam turbine machinery. Upon completion in 1909–10, the sister ships served as flotilla leaders for destroyer flotillas of the First Fleet until 1913 when they were assigned to battleship squadrons. When the First World War began in August 1914, they remained with their squadrons as the First Fleet was incorporated into the Grand Fleet, although they changed squadrons over the course of the war. Both ships were present during the Battle of Jutland in mid-1916, but neither fired a shot. They were converted into minelayers the following year and both ships laid minefields in early 1918 in addition to other missions. The sisters were reduced to reserve in 1919 and sold for scrap in 1921 and 1926.

Design
Like the earlier scout cruisers, the Boadicea class was designed to provide destroyer flotillas with a command ship, theoretically offering the ability to scout ahead of the group and locate targets for the smaller ships to attack. They were enlarged and more powerfully armed versions of the earlier ships, fitted with steam turbines. Curiously, they were no faster than the older ships and equally unsuccessful in their intended role as they lacked the speed of the destroyers they were supposed to escort.

They were powered by two sets of Parsons steam turbines, each driving two shafts. Her crew consisted of 317 officers and enlisted men.

The main armament of the Boadicea class consisted of six breech-loading (BL) four-inch (102 mm) Mk VII guns. The forward pair of guns were mounted side by side on a platform on the forecastle, the middle pair were amidships, one on each broadside, and the two remaining guns were on the centreline of the quarterdeck, one ahead of the other. Her secondary armament was four quick-firing (QF) three-pounder  Vickers Mk I guns and two submerged 21-inch (533 mm) torpedo tubes. During the war, four additional four-inch guns were added amidships to increase her firepower. A QF three-inch 20 cwt anti-aircraft gun was also added. In 1918 it was replaced by a four-inch gun.

As scout cruisers, the ships were only lightly protected to maximise their speed. Their conning tower was protected by 4 inches of armour.

Ships

Service
Both Boadicea and Bellona began their careers with destroyer flotillas of the First Fleet, Boadicea as senior officers' ship for the 1st Destroyer Flotilla and Bellona with the 2nd Destroyer Flotilla. The former was transferred to the 3rd Destroyer Flotilla in mid-1912 and the sisters were transferred to the 2nd and the 1st Battle Squadrons, respectively, of the First Fleet in 1913. Both ships were assigned to positions at the rear of their squadrons and did not fire their guns during the Battle of Jutland on 31 May – 1 June 1916.

The sisters remained with their squadrons until 1917 when they were converted into minelayers, Bellona in May and Boadicea in October, Bellona replacing her sister in the 2nd Battle Squadron that month. After her conversion, Boadicea was assigned to the 4th Battle Squadron in January 1918 and neither ship was reassigned before the end of the war. They laid mines at the entrance to the Kattegat on the nights of 18/19 and 24/25 February 1918 and both made several other sorties to lay their mines before the end of the war. They were placed in reserve after the war and taken out of service in 1920. Bellona was quickly sold for scrap in 1921, but Boadicea was not sold until 1926.

Notes

Footnotes

Bibliography

External links

Boadicea class in World War I
History of the Boadicea class

 
Cruiser classes
Ship classes of the Royal Navy
Ships built in Pembroke Dock